The 1978 Sacramento State Hornets football team represented California State University, Sacramento as a member of the Far Western Conference (FWC) during the 1978 NCAA Division II football season. Led by first-year head coach Bob Mattos, Sacramento State compiled an overall record of 1–9 with a mark of 1–4 in conference play, placing fifth in the FWC. The team was outscored by its opponents 304 to 84 for the season. The Hornets played home games at Hornet Stadium in Sacramento, California.

Schedule

References

Sacramento State
Sacramento State Hornets football seasons
Sacramento State Hornets football